Keith Molloy (7 August 1924 – 31 January 2005) was an Australian rules footballer who played with Melbourne and Hawthorn in the Victorian Football League (VFL).

Notes

External links 

1924 births
Australian rules footballers from Victoria (Australia)
Melbourne Football Club players
Hawthorn Football Club players
2005 deaths